Suraj Srinivasan is an American economist currently the Philip J. Stomberg Professor of Business Administration at Harvard Business School.  Srinivasan graduated from Birla Institute of Technology and Science, Pilani, Indian Institute of Management Calcutta, and Harvard Business School.

References

Harvard Business School faculty
21st-century American economists
Living people
Indian Institute of Management Calcutta alumni
Birla Institute of Technology and Science, Pilani alumni
Harvard Business School alumni
Year of birth missing (living people)